The Mid-county Memo was a monthly newspaper serving the Gateway and Parkrose neighborhoods of east Portland in the U.S. state of Oregon. It was founded in May 1985.

Since about 2011, the Memo has been part of The Oregonian's "Oregonian News Network," The network includes news outlets that The Oregonian has identified as providing "daily original reporting that brings new information to the public" and cover "hyperlocal or niche focused news and information." The Oregonian frequently picks up stories from the Memo. Willamette Week has credited the Memo's coverage on several occasions, and other publications have interviewed its publisher for his views on East Portland.

The Oregonian interviewed publisher Tim Curran in 2012. At that time, Curran had served as publisher for 20 years. Curran purchased the newspaper from Tom and Marcia Pry, the founders, in 1991. He traced the term "East Portland" to the mid-1980s, when Portland annexed most of the unincorporated area between itself and Gresham, which had previously been known as the "mid-county."

It was announced on the paper's website that the January 2019 issue would be its last. While the website, social media accounts and blogs would continue to remain active, owner Tim Curran wrote that the paper would no longer be issued in print format. In total, the publication was around for 34 years and published 404 issues.

References

References 
 Official web site
 https://www.mondotimes.com/1/world/us/37/2067/17237

Newspapers published in Portland, Oregon
Publications established in 1985
Defunct newspapers published in Oregon
2019 disestablishments in Oregon
Publications disestablished in 2019
1985 establishments in Oregon